Lee Meredith (born Judith Lee Sauls, October 22, 1947) is an American actress.

Biography
On October 22, 1947, Meredith was born Judith Lee Sauls in River Edge, New Jersey, and grew up in Fair Lawn, New Jersey. When she was 15, she joined the Manhattan Rockets precision dance team. Following her high-school graduation, she became a model and studied at the American Academy of Dramatic Arts. She is married to film producer Bert Stratford. 

Meredith's most well-known role is that of the Swedish secretary Ulla in the original 1967 version of The Producers. In 2002, she appeared on the 35th-anniversary DVD edition of The Producers, where she gives an interview and recreates her dance from the original film.

In 1972, she appeared in a sketch in the original Broadway production of The Sunshine Boys and repeated her performance in the 1975 film version with Walter Matthau and George Burns. In 1973, Meredith appeared as Reginald Van Gleason's object of desire in the first Jackie Gleason comeback special, broadcast on CBS.  In 1975, she appeared on one week of Match Game 75 episodes.

In the 1980s, Meredith appeared with writer Mickey Spillane in a series of commercials for Miller Lite beer.

Credits

References

External links

1947 births
Living people
20th-century American actresses
Actresses from New Jersey
American film actresses
American television actresses
People from Fair Lawn, New Jersey
21st-century American women